Per Schlingmann (born 16 October 1970 in Borås) was the party secretary of the Swedish Moderate Party between 28 September 2006 and 1 October 2010 (succeeding Sven Otto Littorin), and a prominent figure in its political reorientation following the 2002 election defeat and leading to its 2006 election success.

From 11 October 2010 to 24 May 2012, Sclingmann served as State Secretary for Communications to the Prime Minister.

References

External links

Per Schlingmann moderaternas partisekreterare

|-

|-

Moderate Party politicians
Living people
1970 births
University of Gothenburg alumni
People from Borås Municipality